The Beltway Boys was an American weekly television show. The title referred to the Capital Beltway – the circumferential freeway surrounding Washington, D.C. (see Inside the Beltway) – and to the two journalists who hosted the show: Mort Kondracke and Fred Barnes. Airing initially in the United States on Saturday evenings at 6:00 pm ET on the Fox News Channel, the program was a weekly digest and discussion of political issues.  The show was taped in Fox News' Washington studios on Fridays. Fox News Channel cancelled the show in April 2009.

Overview

Typically, the program began with three primary topics ("Hot Stories") that Kondracke and Barnes discussed at length.  It then looked at newsworthy events in the political lives of national leaders in its "Ups and Downs" segment, characterizing the events as positive for the individual (up) or negative (down).

References

Beltway Boys, The
1998 American television series debuts
2009 American television series endings
1990s American television news shows
2000s American television news shows